Li's field is a tongue-in-cheek conspiracy theory in Hong Kong over the existence of a force field that repels tropical cyclones from the city.

Background
The "Li" in Li's field refers to local business tycoon Li Ka-shing, the implied developer of the field. The basis of Li's field rests on the way Hong Kong's government is organized. The city's Commerce and Economic Development Bureau oversees the Hong Kong Observatory, and that has led to speculations the Observatory bases its issuance of tropical cyclone warning signals on economic reasoning, instead of scientific reasoning. 

In Hong Kong, schools above kindergarten level are shut down when Tropical Cyclone Signal Number 8 is issued (kindergarten classes are suspended when Signal Number 3 is issued), and all non-essential staff at a workplace are sent home. Some believe businesses have pressured the Observatory into avoiding the issuance of Typhoon Signal Number 8, in an effort to avoid economic losses. 

In response, former Observatory Chief Lee Boon Ying told reporters in 2010 the Observatory has always put the safety of Hong Kong residents as its first priority, and is not swayed by business or economic concerns.

Examples
From 2005 to 2006, and again in 2010, the Observatory did not issue a single tropical cyclone warning above Number 3.

Typhoon Prapiroon
In 2006, Typhoon Prapiroon brought gale to storm winds (63-117 km/h, Beaufort scale force 8-11) to Hong Kong, fulfilling the requirements for the No.8 Gale or Storm signal.  The storm overturned containers, uprooted trees, and caused many flight delays at the airport, but the Observatory did not issue Signal Number 8, remaining at the lower level Signal Number 3.

Observatory Chief Lam Chiu-ying later said the decision was based on the fact that wind speeds in Kai Tak, near the Victoria Harbour, did not reach the level required for issuing Signal Number 8. Nevertheless, humorous speculation arose that Li Ka-shing was behind the decision, in an effort to maximize productivity from his workers and prop up the economy.

Scientific reason
Media reports in 2010, citing research by the Observatory, revealed the reason behind the fewer occurrences of Signal Number 8. It is believed that an ocean temperature difference between the South China Sea and the Pacific Ocean provides the explanation.

Survey
In an impromptu survey conducted by Observatory Chief Shun Chi Ming at a student forum in 2014, about 20% of approximately 100 students in attendance say they believe Li's Field exists.

Cultural references
Li's force field has been mentioned in local cultural media, and has been the subject of many Internet memes.

"Gambling wall" in Macau
A similar urban legend spread in Macau after Tropical Storm Nida (2016), when the Macao Meteorological and Geophysical Bureau (SMG) only issued a No. 3 typhoon signal (despite it reaching the standards of a No. 8). Some residents believed the SMG did so because the issuance of a No. 8 signal would affect the opening hours of casinos (which represent Macau's largest industry), leading them to joke that there was a "妮妲" (literally: "gambling wall") which protected Macau from typhoons, much like Li's field.

See also
 Li Ka-shing
 Hong Kong tropical cyclone warning signals
 Bielefeld conspiracy
 Birds Aren't Real

References

Culture of Hong Kong
Humour
Satirical conspiracy theories
Typhoons in Hong Kong